Wu Chen (died 208 BC) was a Chinese military general and rebel leader who served Chen Sheng (陳勝) during the Qin Dynasty. Wu was later killed by his subordinate  because Li accidentally performed kowtow to Wu's elder sister. Li felt humiliated by performing this action toward a woman, so he killed Wu as a revenge.

References 
 

Qin dynasty rebels
Chinese warlords